Daniel Joseph Devlin (1814 – February 22, 1867) was a prosperous businessman, City Chamberlain, and prominent citizen of New York City.

Devlin was born at Buncrana, County Donegal, Ireland, in 1814, the son of Jeremiah Devlin, a farmer and merchant tailor, and his wife, Elizabeth Foster. As a young merchant tailor, Daniel emigrated to America in 1833. Three younger brothers later joined him in America; two sisters, and a brother, Phillip Devlin, who became a Catholic priest, remained in Ireland. Daniel Devlin moved to Louisville, Kentucky, and is believed to have worked for a time as a steamboat clerk on the Ohio and Mississippi rivers, which led him to encourage his brother William Devlin to establish himself in Louisiana. Devlin founded a jeans manufacturing company in Louisville, and later moved to New York City, where he and two of his brothers established a clothing company, Devlin Brothers. Daniel Devlin was named City Chamberlain of New York in 1861, and remained in that position until his death.

After the outbreak of the American Civil War, he headed the executive committee charged with recruitment and financing for the Irish Brigade of the Union Army. In politics, he was a Democrat, and played a prominent role in the New York State Democratic convention in 1864. He was a director of the Union Trust Company of New York, and a prominent Catholic layman who in 1863 helped found the Society for the Protection of Destitute Roman Catholic Children in the City of New York and in 1864 established a scholarship at St. Francis Xavier College. Devlin lived from the 1850s onward in an Italianate villa overlooking the Hudson River in Manhattanville.

Devlin died in New York on February 22, 1867. His brothers donated a stained glass window in his memory to St. Patrick's Cathedral, where it can be seen today.

References
 National Archives & Records Administration, Washington, Microfilm publication M261, Roll 23 (records of arrivals in Port of New York, 1833).
 The Irish Brigade. New York Times, November 11, 1861, 3.
 Destitute Catholic Children. New York Times, June 7, 1863, 8.
 Democratic State Convention. New York Times, September 16, 1864, 1.
 Financial. New York Times, March 6, 1866, 6.
 St. Francis Xavier's College - Sixteenth Annual Commencement. New York Times, July 7, 1866, 8.
 Local Intelligence. New York Times, February 23, 1867, 3.
 Devlin family archives.

New York (state) Democrats
Philanthropists from New York (state)
People of New York (state) in the American Civil War
Roman Catholic activists
People from Buncrana
People from County Donegal
Businesspeople from New York City
Irish Brigade (U.S.)
1814 births
1867 deaths
Irish emigrants to the United States (before 1923)
19th-century American philanthropists
19th-century American businesspeople